Frédéric-Georges Herr (7 May 1855 – 27 October 1932) was a French general.

The son of an Alsatian surgeon who chose to emigrate to France following the annexation of Alsace-Lorraine after the Franco-Prussian War, Herr entered the École polytechnique in 1874. He married Anne Peugeot, the heiress of the Peugeot family, in 1883.

From 1895 to 1902, he took an active part in the colonization of Madagascar under the order of General Gallieni.

Promoted General of Division in 1914, he distinguished himself at the Battle of Les Éparges (1915) and played an important role in the Battle of Verdun (1916).

He was the author of the book: Herr, Général F-G. : L’Artillerie, ce qu’elle à été, ce qu’elle est, ce qu’elle doit être
Berger-Levrault, éditeurs, Nancy, Paris, Strasbourg, 1924, 6e édition

1855 births
1932 deaths
People from Haut-Rhin
French generals
French military personnel of World War I
Grand Croix of the Légion d'honneur
École Polytechnique alumni